is a passenger railway station located in the city of Narashino, Chiba Prefecture Japan, operated by the private railway company, Keisei Electric Railway.

Lines
Yatsu Station is served by the Keisei Main Line, and is located 28.4 km from the official starting point of the line at Keisei-Ueno Station.

Station layout
Yatsu Station has a single island platform connected by a footbridge  to the elevated station building.

Platforms

History
The name reverted to Yatsu Kaigain in 1939, as part of the Japanese government's austerity measures in the early stages of World War II, and reverted to Yatsu-Yūen Station on 1 April 1948. Yatsu-Yūen Amusement Park ceased operation on 24 November 1984, and the station was renamed to its current name. From 1985, the station ceased to be served by express trains.

Station numbering was introduced to all Keisei Line stations on 17 July 2010; Yatsu Station was assigned station number KS25.

Passenger statistics
In fiscal 2019, the station was used by an average of 11,033 passengers daily (boarding passengers only).

Surrounding area
 Yatsu Higata Tidal Flat

See also
 List of railway stations in Japan

References

External links

 Keisei Station layout

Railway stations in Japan opened in 1921
Railway stations in Chiba Prefecture
Keisei Main Line
Narashino